Zhang Yangyang may refer to:

Zhang Yangyang (rower) (born 1989), Chinese rower
Zhang Yangyang (singer) (born 1991), Chinese singer